In rhetoric, a rhetorical device, persuasive device, or stylistic device is a technique that an author or speaker uses to convey to the listener or reader a meaning with the goal of persuading them towards considering a topic from a perspective, using language designed to encourage or provoke an emotional display of a given perspective or action. Rhetorical devices evoke an emotional response in the audience through use of language, but that is not their primary purpose. Rather, by doing so, they seek to make a position or argument more compelling than it would otherwise be.

Modes of persuasion
Originating from Aristotle's Rhetoric, the four modes of persuasion in an argument are as follows:

Logos  is an appeal to logic using intellectual reasoning and argument structure such as giving claims, sound reasons for them, and supporting evidence.

 Pathos  is an appeal to the audience's emotions, often based on claims they hold. By influencing their feelings, the audience can be pushed to take an action, believe an argument, or respond in a certain way.

 Ethos  is an appeal based on the good character of the author. It involves persuading the audience that the author is credible and well-qualified, or possesses other desirable qualities that mean the author's arguments carry weight.

 Kairos  is an appeal to timing, such as whether the argument occurs at the right time and in the ideal surrounding context to be accepted. It has been argued to be the most important since no matter how logical, emotionally powerful and credible the argument, if the argument is made in an unsuitable context or environment, the audience will not be receptive to it.

Rhetorical devices can be used to facilitate and enhance the effectiveness of the use of rhetoric in any of the four above modes of persuasion. Rather than certain rhetorical devices falling under certain modes of persuasion, rhetorical devices are techniques authors, writers or speakers use to execute rhetorical appeals. Thus, they overlap with figures of speech, differing in that they are used specifically for persuasive purposes, and may involve how authors introduce and arrange arguments (see the section on discourse level devices) in addition to creative use of language.

Sonic devices
Sonic devices depend on sound. Sonic rhetoric is used as a clearer or swifter way of communicating content in an understandable way. Sonic rhetoric delivers messages to the reader or listener by prompting a certain reaction through auditory perception.

Alliteration 

Alliteration is the repetition of the sound of an initial consonant or consonant cluster in subsequent syllables. It is one of the most well-known and effective rhetorical devices throughout literature and persuasive speeches.

Assonance 
Assonance is the repetition of similar vowel sounds across neighbouring words.

Consonance 
Consonance is the repetition of consonant sounds across words which have been deliberately chosen. It is different from alliteration as it can happen at any place in the word, not just the beginning.

In the following example, the k sound is repeated five times.

Cacophony 
Cacophony refers to the use of unpleasant sounds, such as the explosive consonants k, g, t, d, p and b, the hissing sounds sh and s, and also the affricates ch and j, in rapid succession in a line or passage, creating a harsh and discordant effect.

Onomatopoeia 
Onomatopoeia is the use of words that attempt to emulate a sound. When used colloquially, it is often accompanied by multiple exclamation marks and in all caps. It is common in comic strips and some cartoons.

Some examples include these: smek, thwap, kaboom, ding-dong, plop, bang and pew.

Word repetition 
Word repetition rhetorical devices operate via repeating words or phrases in various ways, usually for emphasis.

Anadiplosis/Conduplicatio 
Anadiplosis involves repeating the last word(s) of one sentence, phrase or clause at or near the beginning of the next.

Conduplicatio is similar, involving repeating a key word in subsequent clauses.

Anaphora/Epistrophe/Symploce/Epanalepsis 
Anaphora is repeating the same word(s) at the  beginning  of successive sentences, phrases or clauses.

Epistrophe is repeating the same word(s) at the end instead.

Symploce is a simultaneous combination of both anaphora and epistrophe, but repeating different words at the start and end.

Epanalepsis repeats the same word(s) at the beginning and end.

Epizeuxis/Antanaclasis 
Epizeuxis is simply repetition of the same word without interruption.

Antanaclasis is more witty, repeating the same word but in a different sense. This can take advantage of polysemy.

 first referring to extinguishing the candle, then referring to killing Desdemona.)

 John of Gaunt plays on his name.

Diacope 
Diacope is the repetition of a word or phrase after an intervening word or clause. It can also be thought of as a reshaped epanalepsis.

Word relation 
Word relation rhetorical devices operate via deliberate connections between words within a sentence.

Antithesis/Antimetabole/Chiasmus 
Antithesis involves putting together two opposite ideas in a sentence to achieve a contrasting effect. Contrast is emphasised by parallel but similar structures of the opposing phrases or clauses to draw the listeners' or readers' attention. Compared to chiasmus, the ideas must be opposites.

Antimetabole involves repeating but reversing the order of words, phrases or clauses. The exact same words are repeated, as opposed to antithesis or chiasmus.

Chiasmus involves parallel clause structure but in reverse order for the second part. This means that words or elements are repeated in the reverse order. The ideas thus contrasted are often related but not necessarily opposite.

Asyndeton/Polysyndeton 
Asyndeton is the removal of conjunctions like "or", "and", or "but" where it might have been expected because the sentence flows better, or more poetically, without them.

 

Polysyndeton is the use of more conjunctions than strictly needed. This device is often combined with anaphora.

Auxesis/Catacosmesis 
Auxesis is arranging words in a list from least to most significant. This can create climax.

Catacosmesis, the opposite, involves arranging them from most to least significant.

This can create anticlimax for humour or other purposes.

Oxymoron 
An oxymoron is a 2-word paradox often achieved through the deliberate use of antonyms. This creates an internal contradiction that can have rhetorical effect.

Zeugma/Syllepsis 
Zeugma involves the linking of two or more words or phrases that occupy the same position in a sentence to another word or phrase in the same sentence. This can take advantage of the latter word having multiple meanings depending on context to create a clever use of language that can make the sentence and the claim thus advanced more eloquent and persuasive.

In the following examples, 2 nouns (as direct objects) are linked to the same verb which must then be interpreted in 2 different ways.
Zeugma is sometimes defined broadly to include other ways in which one word in a sentence can relate to two or more others. Even simple constructions like multiple subjects linked to the same verb are then "zeugma without complication".

Discourse level 
Discourse level rhetorical devices rely on relations between phrases, clauses and sentences. Often they relate to how new arguments are introduced into the text or how previous arguments are emphasized. Examples include antanagoge, apophasis, aporia, hypophora, metanoia and procatalepsis.

Amplification/Pleonasm 
Amplification involves repeating a word or expression while adding more detail, to emphasise what might otherwise be passed over. This allows one to call attention to and expand a point to ensure the reader realizes its importance or centrality in the discussion.

Pleonasm involves using more words than necessary to describe an idea. This creates emphasis and can introduce additional elements of meaning.

Antanagoge 
Antanagoge involves "placing a good point or benefit next to a fault criticism, or problem in order to reduce the impact or significance of the negative point".

One scenario involves a situation when one is unable to respond to a negative point and chooses instead to introduce another point to reduce the accusation's significance.

Apophasis 
Apophasis is the tactic of bringing up a subject by denying that it should be brought up. It is also known as paralipsis, occupatio, praeteritio, preterition, or parasiopesis.
{{quote|
There's something tells me, but it is not love,
I would not lose you; and you know yourself, 
Hate counsels not in such a quality. |Shakespeare The Merchant of Venice 3.2)

This device has a number of effects that make it quite useful in politics. Donald Trump, for instance, has been noted to frequently use apophasis when attacking his political opponents.

Aporia 
Aporia is the rhetorical expression of doubt. The most famous example of this is undoubtedly Hamlet's soliloquy, which begins:

Another example is in Antony's famous speech at Caesar's funeral, which includes examples such as:
{{quote|
Did this in Caesar seem ambitious? When that the poor have cried, Caesar hath wept. |(Shakespere Julius Caesar 3.2)

When the rhetorical question posed is answered, this is also an instance of hypophora.

Diasyrmus
Rejecting an argument through ridiculous comparison.

Derision 
This involves setting up an opposing position to ridicule without offering a counterargument, such as:

Enthymeme 
Syllogism which omits either one of the premises or the conclusion. The omitted part must be clearly understood by the reader. Sometimes this depends on contextual knowledge.
 the premise implied is that no ambitious person would refuse the crown)
 to arrive at the omitted conclusion that Singapore is exceptional, the visitor must know that Singapore has but a short history of 50-odd years as an independent nation)

Hyperbole 
Hyperbole is deliberate exaggeration. This can be for literary effect:

Or for argumentative effect:

Hypophora 
The use of hypophora is the technique whereby one asks a question and then proceeds to answer the question. This device is one of the most useful strategies in writing essays to inform or persuade a reader.

Innuendo 
This device indirectly implies an accusation without explicitly stating it. This can be combined with apophasis.

Metanoia 
Metanoia qualifies a statement or by recalling or rejecting it in part or full, and then re-expressing it in a better, milder, or stronger way. A negative is often used to do the recalling.

He was the best of men - no, of all humanity.

Procatalepsis 
By anticipating and answering a possible objection, procatalepsis allows an argument to continue while rebutting points opposing it. It is a relative of hypophora. Procatalepsis shows that concerns have been thought through.

Understatement 
Understatement, or meiosis, involves deliberately understating the importance, significance or magnitude of a subject. This means the force of the description is less than what is expected, thus highlighting the irony or extreme nature of an event.

 Mercutio dies of his wounds shortly after.

The captain's announcement onboard British Airways Flight 9 has been described as 'a masterpiece of understatement':

A subtype of understatement is litotes, which uses negation:

Irony and imagery

Irony 
Irony is the figure of speech where the words of a speaker intends to express a meaning that is directly opposite of the said words.
 Antony attacks Brutus's character and that of his co-conspirators

Metaphor 
Metaphor connects two different things to one another. It is frequently invoked by the verb to be. The use of metaphor in rhetoric is primarily to convey to the audience a new idea or meaning by linking it to an already familiar idea or meaning. The literary critic and rhetorician, I. A. Richards, divides a metaphor into two parts: the vehicle and the tenor.

In the following example, Romeo compares Juliet to the sun (the vehicle), and this metaphor connecting Juliet to the sun shows that Romeo sees Juliet as being radiant and regards her as an essential being (the tenor).

Personification 
Personification is the representation of animals, inanimate objects and ideas as having human attributes.

In the following example Romeo personifies love as being blind yet able to enamour someone.

In another example:

Simile 
Simile compares two different things that resemble each other in at least one way using like or as to explain the comparison. For example, the as... as construction as compared to metaphor which is direct equivalence.

In the following example, the nurse compares Romeo's manners and behaviour to a lamb.

Another example can be seen in a conversation between Emilia and Othello.

Metonymy 
Metonymy is a figure of speech where a thing or concept is referred to indirectly by the name of an attribute or adjunct for that of the thing meant.

Examples:

- "crown" to denote king or queen.

- Oval Office or Washington to refer to the President of the United States of America.

Synecdoche 
A synecdoche is a class of metonymy, often by means of either mentioning a part for the whole or conversely the whole for one of its parts. Examples from common English expressions include "suits" (for "businessmen"), "boots" (for "soldiers") ("pars pro toto"), and "America" (for "the United States of America", "totum pro parte").

See also
Figure of speech
Glossary of rhetorical terms
Rhetorical modes
Stylistic device
Translation (rhetorical device)

References

External links
Handbook of rhetorical devices
List of Fallacious Arguments
Online Resource of Rhetorical Devices
Rhetorical Figures in Sound